Tanghin (alternatively Tanguen) may refer to several places in Burkina Faso:

Three places in Ganzourgou Province:

Tanghin, Boudry
Tanghin, Méguet
Tanghin, Zoungou

Two places in Bazèga Province:

Tanghin, Saponé
Tanghin, Toece

One place in Boulkiemdé Province:

Tanghin, Boulkiemdé